The long-distance hiking trail 34 ( or GR 34 for short) is a  French coastal path that starts from Mont-Saint-Michel (Manche) and ends in Saint-Nazaire (Loire-Atlantique). It runs along almost the entire coast of the Brittany region from Mont Saint-Michel and, beyond the limit between Morbihan and Loire-Atlantique, to the mouth of the Loire. It largely follows former customs paths. These paths, gradually abandoned during the first half of the 20th century, allowed customs officers to patrol the coast from their guardhouses, located at key observation points on the Brittany coast.

Origins
The Breton coastal path has its origins in the late 18th century, after the French Revolution. By a decree of 5 November 1790, the Constituent Assembly thus abolished all internal borders and decided to "retreat customs to the borders".

It was in this context that the Breton customs officers' path was created in 1791. The men, who ensured the surveillance in pairs, took turns every two hours and had the task of monitoring the coasts and fighting smuggling. Along the path, gabions, cabins, huts, straw huts and many small dry-stone constructions built by the customs officers themselves provided places to stop.
 They are in addition to the official positions provided by the Customs Administration.

The objectives of the path were fourfold:

 to stop contraband, especially that due to illegal landings of English goods
 to defend the coasts, with the creation, from 1831, of a military customs body
 to rescue shipwreck victims and ensure that inhabitants did not loot stranded ships
 to carry out police missions

Recent history

 1968: the first long-distance hiking trail, between Beg Leguer and Pors Mabo (in Trébeurden) near Lannion (Côtes-d'Armor), was initiated by Émile Orain, who in 1967 mobilized friends and youth groups to clear this section of the pink granite coast.
 1974: the National Committee for Long-Distance Hiking Trails created the first section of the long-distance hiking trail in Finistère, linking Douarnenez to Faou. It belonged to the GR 37, but part would be linked to the GR 34.
 1976: the law of easement of passage by the sea (law no. 1285 of December 31, 1976) was passed, meaning that "The riparian properties of the public maritime domain are encumbered, on a strip 3 meters wide, to leave a right of way intended to ensure exclusively the passage of pedestrians."
 1978: the French Federation of Hiking in Brittany was created.
 2008: the complete markup of the Breton GR was completed, the hiker being able to cover its 1,700 km in one go.
 2017: the Finistère section was elected as the Best French GR of 2017.

Route

Manche
 Mont-Saint-Michel
  River Couesnon

Ille-et-Vilaine
 Dol-de-Bretagne
 Cathedral of Saint-Samson de Dol-de-Bretagne (13th–15th-century).
Church and windmill of Mont-Dol.
 Cancale
Church of  Saint-Méen.
 Saint-Malo
Dinard

Côtes-d'Armor
 Saint-Cast-le-Guildo
 Cap Fréhel
 Erquy
Saint-Brieuc
 Côte de Granit Rose 
Perros-Guirec
Ploumanac'h
Trégastel
Trébeurden
Lannion

Finistère
 Morlaix
 Roscoff
 Brest
 At Brélès the GR 34F forks inland and rejoins the coastal GR 34 at Portzic with its lighthouse and fort
 Crozon,  the Parc naturel régional d'Armorique and the Monts d'Arrée further inland
 Douarnenez
 Plomodiern
 Cap Sizun and the Pointe du Raz
 Loctudy
 Pont-Aven

Morbihan
 Lorient
 Quiberon
 Auray
 Vannes
 La Roche-Bernard

Loire-Atlantique
 Le Croisic
 La Turballe
 La Baule
 Pornichet
 Brière Regional Natural Park
 Saint-Nazaire

Economy

In 2018, the trail was used by 9 million users, 40% of whom were locals and 60% tourists. The local economic benefits are estimated at 202 million euros.

Notes

References

See also
 Tro Breizh

External links
 A track of the GR34
 The complete route of GR34

Hiking trails in France
Geography of Manche
Geography of Ille-et-Vilaine
Geography of Côtes-d'Armor
Geography of Finistère
Geography of Morbihan
Geography of Loire-Atlantique
Tourist attractions in Manche
Tourist attractions in Ille-et-Vilaine
Tourist attractions in Côtes-d'Armor
Tourist attractions in Finistère
Tourist attractions in Morbihan
Tourist attractions in Loire-Atlantique